Tim Winn (born June 27, 1977) is an American former basketball player. He played for the St. Bonaventure Bonnies from 1996 to 2000 and was named to the Atlantic 10 All-Conference first team in his senior year.

High school career
Winn played for La Salle Senior High School in Niagara Falls. He was named Western New York Player of the Year in 1996.

College career
Winn played for St. Bonaventure. In his freshman season, 1996–97, he ranked second on the team with 13.3 points per game. The following year, he averaged 12.2 points per game.

In 1998–99, Winn averaged 13.0 points and finished second in the nation with 3.5 steals per game. He was suspended for the first six games of the season when he was arrested for getting into a fight with another student. After pleading guilty to misdemeanor assault, he was sentenced to three years' probation.

In Winn's senior season, 1999–2000, he averaged 13.6 points per game and led the Bonnies in scoring. He also had 103 steals, which set a school record. He was named to the Atlantic 10 All-Conference and All-Defense first teams. Winn finished his college career with 1,407 points, 349 assists, and 319 steals.

Professional career
After college, Winn played professional basketball in several leagues in the United States and overseas. In 2006, while playing for the Buffalo Rapids of the American Basketball Association, he averaged 25 points, 11 assists, and 4 steals and represented the Rapids in the ABA All Star Game.

Personal life
Winn lives in Charlotte, North Carolina, with his wife, Tamaron  and 2 sons Tim Jr and Rhasheen. He also has a daughter Timischa. He works at Bank of America.

References

1977 births
Living people
American expatriate basketball people in Canada
ABA All-Star Game players
Basketball players from New York (state)
Point guards
Rockford Lightning players
St. Bonaventure Bonnies men's basketball players
American men's basketball players